Sir George Evelyn Sinclair  (6 November 1912 – 21 September 2005) was Conservative MP for Dorking, Surrey, 1964–79.

Education
Sinclair was a bright pupil at Abingdon School from 1923 to 1931, and one of a group known as the 'Grundy boys' – named after the then headmaster. His brothers, James Francis Sinclair and Lindsay Sinclair, also attended the school.  Sinclair left the school having become Head of School, Captain of Boats, Captain of Cricket, Captain of Rugby and having won the Pembroke Scholarship. In 1969 he returned to the school as a governor. He read Greats at Pembroke College, Oxford.

Career
In 1936, Sinclair joined the Colonial Service and was posted to the Gold Coast.
He served with the Royal West African Frontier Force during World War II. After the war he returned to the Gold Coast, then served in Togoland. He was deputy governor of Cyprus from 1955 to 1960, during the EOKA troubles. He was appointed OBE in 1950, CMG in 1956 and knighted for his Colonial Service work in 1960. Sinclair was a councillor on Wimbledon Borough Council from 1962.

He became the Conservative Party MP for Dorking in 1964, actively campaigning on human rights, abortion and environmental issues. He retired from parliamentary politics in 1979. He continued in public life, he was especially involved with the Global Forum of Spiritual and Parliamentary Leaders on Human Survival.

He was on the governing body of Abingdon School from 1969 to 1988 and was Chairman of the Governors from 1972 to 1980.

See also
 List of Old Abingdonians

References

Abingdon News January 2006 - printed school newsletter.
Sir George Sinclair (obituary), The Telegraph, London, 1 October 2005
Sir George Sinclair (obituary), The Guardian, London, 12 October 2005

External links
 
 

1912 births
2005 deaths
People educated at Abingdon School
Alumni of Pembroke College, Oxford
Colonial Administrative Service officers
Royal West African Frontier Force officers
British Cyprus people
Conservative Party (UK) MPs for English constituencies
Councillors in Greater London
UK MPs 1964–1966
UK MPs 1966–1970
UK MPs 1970–1974
UK MPs 1974
UK MPs 1974–1979
Knights Bachelor
Companions of the Order of St Michael and St George
Officers of the Order of the British Empire
Gold Coast (British colony) people
British Togoland people
Governors of Abingdon School